The 76th Tactical Reconnaissance Group is a disbanded United States Army Air Forces organization. It was last active in 1944 as part of the Desert Training Center at Thermal Army Air Field, California.

History
The group was constituted and activated in early 1942 at MacDill Field, Florida as the 76th Observation Group shortly after the United States entered World War II. Its original squadron was the 24th Observation Squadron, which was joined a few days later by the 23d Observation Squadron when the group moved to Key Field, Mississippi.

The group trained in aerial reconnaissance and air support techniques until March 1943 under Third Air Force. It participated in maneuvers with Second Army until September 1943 when it moved to Thermal AAF and began participating in desert training in California and Arizona. In anticipation of this move, its existing squadrons were reassigned and replaced by new units. It was disbanded on 15 April 1944.

Lineage
 Constituted on 5 February 1942 as the 76th Observation Group
 Activated on 27 February 1942
 Redesignated as the 76th Reconnaissance Group on 2 April 1943
 Redesignated as the 76th Tactical Reconnaissance Group on 11 August 1943
 Disbanded on 15 April 1944

Subordinate Units

 20th Observation Squadron (later 20th Reconnaissance Squadron, 20th Tactical Reconnaissance Squadron): 12 March 1942 – 23 August 1943
 23d Observation Squadron (later 23d Reconnaissance Squadron): 2 March 1942 – 20 June 1943
 24th Observation Squadron (later 24th Reconnaissance Squadron): 27 February 1942 – 11 August 1943
 70th Reconnaissance Squadron: 20 June 1943 – 11 August 1943
 91st Tactical Reconnaissance Squadron: 11 August 1943 – 23 August 1943

 97th Tactical Reconnaissance Squadron: 23 August 1943 – 15 Apr 1944
 101st Photographic Mapping Squadron: 21 October 1943 – 29 Mar 1944
 102d Tactical Reconnaissance Squadron: 5 April 1944 – 15 April 1944
 106th Reconnaissance Squadron: 20 June 1943 – 13 July 1943
 121st Liaison Squadron: 30 April 1943 – 11 August 1943

Assignments
 Third Air Force, 27 February 1942
 3d Ground Air Support Command (later III Air Support Command, III Reconnaissance Command), 27 February 1942
 Desert Training Center, ca. 20 September 1943
 III Tactical Air Division, ca. 15 December 1943 – 15 April 1944

Stations Assigned
 MacDill Field, Florida, 27 February 1942
 Key Field, Mississippi, c. 3 March 1942
 Pope Field, North Carolina, 28 March 1942
 Vichy Army Air Field, Missouri, 10 December 1942
 Morris Field, North Carolina, 10 May 1943
 Thermal Army Air Field, California ca. 20 September 1943 – 15 April 1944

Aircraft Flown

 Douglas A-20 Havoc
 North American B-25 Mitchell
 Stinson L-1 Vigilant
 Piper L-4 Cub

 Stinson L-5 Sentinel
 Interstate L-6 Grasshopper
 Bell P-39 Airacobra
 Curtiss P-40 Warhawk

Awards
 
 American Theater of World War II

References

Notes

Bibliography

External links

Military units and formations established in 1942
076